The Bryant Building is a historic retail building located in Cleveland, Ohio, in the United States. The building, designed by the prominent local architectural firm of Christian, Schwarzenburg and Gaede, was constructed by Mall Motor Co. as their new salesroom and service center, and was completed in 1921. The structure was purchased by Bryant Motor Co. in 1922.

The structure was added to the National Register of Historic Places (NRHP) on December 11, 2014.

Construction of the building
The Mall Motor Co. was an automobile dealership located in Cleveland, Ohio. In the fall of 1920, Mall Motor Co. purchased a long on the north side of Superior Avenue between E. 12th and E. 13th Streets. By December, Mall Motor Co. had hired the locally prominent architectural firm of Christian, Schwarzenburg and Gaede to design a $250,000 ($ in  dollars) structure consisting of a basement and two above-ground stories. Construction would include a brick foundation, steel frame, reinforced concrete walls and floors, and brick interior walls. The structure would also have steam heat.

The $250,000 ($ in  dollars) contract for the building was let in April 1921. Local building firm Lundoff Bicknell & Co. was the general contractor, and provided brick, carpentry, and masonry work as well. The heating system was designed, manufactured, and installed by Warden & Lease; the plumbing system by Euclid Avenue Plumbing Co.; and the cooling system by Lee H. Gould. The building rose swiftly, and was completed by the end of April 1921.

A mezzanine with offices overlooked the sales room. The sales area also featured restrooms specifically set aside for female patrons. Behind the salesroom was a  service area and garage. This area featured a lounge and showers for employee use.

Mall Motor Co. formally opened the structure on July 24, 1921.

History of the building
Mall Motor Co. sold the building to the Bryant Motor Co. in September 1922.

At some point in the 20th century,  of garage at the rear of the building was demolished.

Cuyahoga County purchased the building some time before 1990, and used as the headquarters of the county title agency.

Cuyahoga County began attempting to sell the  building to a private owner about 2012. The structure finally sold for an undisclosed sum in 2016 to Masthead Brewing, a brew pub. The new owner renovated  of the front of the building into restaurant space, removing the dropped ceiling to expose the original ceiling height and adding seating for 250 customers. A sidewalk cafe was added to the Superior Avenue side of the building. The renovation retained the garage doors, which (when raised) allowed the interior to be open to the street during warm weather. Masthead Brewing opened in January 2017.

References

Notes

Citations

External links
Masthead Brewing, current owner of the historic structure

Downtown Cleveland
National Register of Historic Places in Cleveland, Ohio
Buildings and structures in Cleveland
Commercial buildings on the National Register of Historic Places in Ohio
Commercial buildings completed in 1921